Sophie-Carmen Eckhardt-Gramatté (in Moscow, Russia – 2 December 1974 in Stuttgart, Germany) was a Russian-born Canadian composer and virtuoso pianist and violinist.

Biography

Early life
She was born as Sofia (Sonia) Fri[e]dman-Kochevskaya in Moscow, where her mother worked as a governess in the Tolstoy household.  She began to learn piano in 1904 and wrote her first piano compositions in 1905. She studied at the Conservatoire de Paris from 1908–1913, where her teachers included Alfred Brun and Guillaume Rémy for violin, S. Chenée for piano, and Vincent d'Indy and Camille Chevillard for composition.  She made her début in 1910, and her first composition, an Etude de Concert, was published in Paris that year.  She moved to Berlin in 1914, where she studied violin with Bronisław Huberman; by 1919 she had undertaken several concert tours of Western Europe, on which she performed her own works.

Career
In 1920, she married the painter Walter Gramatté in Berlin, and from 1924 to 1926 lived in Spain, where Pablo Casals was her mentor. During this time she wrote her first piano concerto. She toured with Edwin Fischer in Germany in 1925.

Following her husband's death in 1929, she toured the US, performing to critical acclaim her first piano and violin concertos in an American debut with Leopold Stokowski in Philadelphia and Frederick Stock in Chicago. Upon her return to Berlin in 1930 she gave up her performing career to devote herself to composition.

In 1934, she married the journalist and art historian Ferdinand Eckhardt.  From 1936 she pursued further lessons in composition with Max Trapp in Berlin at the Berlin Academy of Arts.  She and her husband moved to Vienna in 1939 where she continued to compose.  In 1945 she became a member of the group that reopened the Austrian branch of the International Society for Contemporary Music.  The couple left Vienna in 1953, and settled in Winnipeg, Canada, where she continued to compose. In Winnipeg she taught several violin students out of a private studio, including violinist Gwen Thompson.

Later life and death
In 1970 she was awarded an honorary doctorate from Brandon University, Manitoba, as well as the title ‘professor’ by the Viennese minister of education.  In 1974 she became the first Canadian composer to receive the Diplôme d’honneur of the Canadian Conference of the Arts. Also that year her life was the subject of a two-hour CBC documentary. Some of her music and old performances are included in Radio Canada International’s Anthology of Canadian Music. A project that she had initiated to encourage young musicians to study and play contemporary music was only realised posthumously in 1976, with the first annual Eckhardt-Gramatté competition for the performance of Canadian music.

Eckhardt-Gramatté died in Stuttgart as a result of an accident.  Her legacy is preserved through the work of the Eckhardt-Gramatté Foundation.

Compositions
As a composer Eckhardt-Gramatté was largely self-taught. She composed more than 175 works.  She learned a great deal from the virtuoso music she performed on both the piano and the violin, and her compositions – especially from the 1920s – reflect this. By the late 1930s her contrapuntal idiom had reached full maturity, and in the following decade her style moved towards neo-classicism and bitonality with some use of jazz idioms. In 1950, with the Piano Sonata no.5, she began to adopt serialism, and by 1955 her use of metric manipulation showed similarities to that of Olivier Messiaen and Boris Blacher. She retained a lifelong admiration for the music of Johann Sebastian Bach – the ending of her 1955 Concerto for Orchestra reworks the prelude from his Partita in E major – and, like Bela Bartók, she frequently used the interval of a fourth as a structural device. Her music is dark, dense and dramatic, with forward drive.  She admired the First Viennese School, but her brand of counterpoint is individual and its dissonance owes much to the post-Romantics. Despite her use of modern techniques, she remained a Romantic in spirit. In addition to writing music, she developed a piano teaching method, the ‘E-gré Piano Technique’, whose basis is the use of rotary movement.

Her compositions include: two symphonies; a concerto for orchestra; a triple concerto for trumpet, clarinet, bassoon, strings, and timpani; three piano concertos; two violin concertos; a piece for two pianos and orchestra; a bassoon concerto; various chamber works; as well as numerous instrumental solos for piano and violin.

Most of her compositions are published by the Canadian Music Centre.

Selected works 
Lagrime for viola (or cello) and piano, E. 61 (1928)
Procession funèbre, Symphonic Poem, E. 74 (1928)
Violin Concerto No. 1, E. 59bis (1929)
Piano Concerto No. 1 in A minor, E. 60 (1925–31)
February Suite for violin and piano (1934)
String Quartet No. 1, E. 103 (1938)
Symphony No. 1 in C major, E. 104 (1939)
String Quartet No. 2 "Hainburger-Quartett" (1943)
Duo for viola and cello, E. 109 (1944)
Piano Concerto No. 2 in E-flat major, E. 117 (1946)
Concertino for string orchestra, E. 119 (1947)
Triotino, "Nicolas-trio" for violin, viola and cello, E. 114 (1947)
Triple Concerto for trumpet, clarinet and bassoon, E. 123 (1949)
Bassoon Concerto, E. 124/25 (1950)
Markantes Stück for piano and orchestra (1950)
Violin Concerto No. 2, E. 127 (1951)
Concerto for orchestra, E. 137 (1954)
Duo concertante for flute and violin, E. 138 (1956)
Duo concertante for cello and piano, E. 146 (1959)
String Quartet No. 3, E. 149 (1964)
Symphony-Concerto for piano and orchestra (Piano Concerto No. 3), E. 154 (1967)
Piano Trio, E. 157 (1968)
Symphony No. 2 "Manitoba" (1970)
Konzertstück for cello and orchestra, E. 163 (1974)
Six piano sonatas (recorded by Marc-André Hamelin) (the last also a suite.)
10 Caprices for solo violin

Recordings 
 The six caprices and other works for piano. Megumi Masaki, piano. Winnipeg : The Eckhardt-Gramatté Foundation, 1991. Worldcat record
 The six piano sonatas = Les six sonates pour piano. Marc-André Hamelin, piano. Toronto : Centrediscs, 2011. Worldcat record
 S.C. Eckhardt-Gramatté 100 : a centenary celebration. Multiple performers, including the composer. [Winnipeg] : Eckhardt-Gramatté Foundation, 1999. Worldcat record
 13 Canadian caprices = 13 caprices canadiens. Jasper Wood, violin.  [Canada] : Analekta?, 1999. Worldcat record

See also 
 Music of Canada
 List of Canadian composers

References 

Eckhardt, Ferdinand (1985). Music from Within: A Biography of the Composer S C Eckhardt-Gramatté, Winnipeg, Manitoba: The University of Manitoba Press.

External links 

 The Eckhardt-Gramatté Foundation
 Canadian Music Centre
 Plangere Editions
 WorldCat

1899 births
1974 deaths
20th-century classical composers
Composers from the Russian Empire
Emigrants from the Russian Empire to Germany
German emigrants to Canada
Canadian classical composers
Classical pianists from the Russian Empire
Russian women pianists
Classical violinists from the Russian Empire
Conservatoire de Paris alumni
20th-century classical violinists
20th-century classical pianists
Women classical composers
20th-century Canadian composers
Emigrants from the Russian Empire to Canada
Women classical violinists
Women classical pianists
20th-century women composers
Canadian women composers
20th-century women pianists